Kateřina Vojáčková (born 24 January 1997) is a Czech snowboarder. She competed in the 2018 Winter Olympics.

References

1997 births
Living people
Snowboarders at the 2018 Winter Olympics
Czech female snowboarders
Olympic snowboarders of the Czech Republic